The Vacheron Constantin Reference 57260 is a single highly complicated mechanical pocket watch, featuring 57 complications. The watch was assembled by Vacheron Constantin and introduced in 2015. The company claims that it is the most complicated mechanical pocket watch ever created, followed up by Patek Philippe Calibre 89 assembled in 1989 and featuring 33 complications. The Reference 57260 took eight years to assemble. The watch has 2,826 parts and 31 hands, weighs 957 grams and spans 98 mm.

The Reference 57260 is one of Vacheron Constantin's tailor-made pocket watches with grand complications. Members of the lineage include James W. Packard's minute repeating pocket watch (1918), which was auctioned for US$1.763 million by Christie's in New York on 15 June 2011, and King Fuad I's pocket watch No. 402833 (1929), which ranks as one of the most expensive watches ever sold at auction, fetching US$2.77 million (3,306,250 CHF) in Geneva on April 03, 2005. In addition, in 1946 Vacheron Constantin made a customized pocket watch for King Farouk of Egypt, the successor of King Fuad I, and in 1948 the company tailored another pocket watch for Count Guy de Boisrouvray of France.

Price
The price agreed between the company and the client is confidential and has not been officially disclosed; however, various sources estimate the price to be in excess of $US10 million. It was built for a single customer, whose details are kept confidential and is only described as "A major watch collector".

Technical specifications

Reference: 57260/000G-B046
Material: White gold
Diameter: 98 mm
Thickness: 50.55 mm
Caliber: 3750
Diameter: 72 mm

Thickness: 36 mm
Number of components: Over 2,800
Number of jewels: 242
Frequency: 2.5Hz / 18,000 vibrations per hour
Power reserve: 60 hours
Number of complications: 57

Fifty-seven complications by function

Time measurement (6 functions)
 Hours, minutes, seconds, average solar time (regulator)
 Three-shaft tourbillon
 Tourbillon regulator with spherical balance spring
 12-hour time zone, second hours and minutes time zone
 24-city display for each time zone
 Day/night indication for 12-hour time zone

Perpetual calendar (7 functions)
 Gregorian perpetual calendar
 Gregorian day name
 Gregorian month name
 Gregorian retrograde date
 Leap year and four-year cycle display
 Number of the day of the week (ISO 8601 calendar)
 Week to view (ISO 8601 calendar)

Hebrew calendar (8 functions)
 Hebrew perpetual calendar and 19-year cycle
 Hebrew day number
 Hebrew month name
 Hebrew date
 Hebrew secular calendar
 Hebrew century, decade and year
 Age of Hebrew year (12 or 13 months)
 Golden number (19 years)

Astrological calendar (9 functions)
 Seasons, equinoxes, solstices and signs of the Zodiac indicated by the hand on the sun
 Star chart (for the owner's city)
 Sidereal time hours
 Sidereal time minutes
 Equation of time
 Sunrise times (for the owner's city)
 Sunset times (for the owner's city)
 Length of day (for the owner's city)
 Length of night (for the owner's city)

Lunar calendar (1 function)
 Moon phases and age (one correction every 1,027 years)

Religious calendar (1 function)
 Date of Yom Kippur

3-column wheel chronograph (4 functions)
 Retrograde seconds chronograph (one column wheel)
 Retrograde split-seconds chronograph (one column wheel)
 Hours counter (one column wheel)
 Minutes counter

Alarm (7 functions)
 Alarm with its own gong and gradual striking
 Alarm strike / silence indicator
 Choice of normal alarm or carillon striking alarm indicator
 Alarm mechanism coupled to the carillon striking mechanism
 Alarm striking with choice of Grande or Petite Sonnerie
 Alarm power-reserve indication
 System to disengage the striking mechanism when alarm barrel fully unwound

Westminster carillon striking (8 functions)
 Westminster carillon chiming with 5 gongs and 5 hammers
 Grande Sonnerie passing strike
 Petite Sonnerie passing strike
 Minute repeating
 Night silence feature (10 p.m. to 8 a.m.)
 System to disengage the striking barrel when fully wound
 Indication for Grande or Petite Sonnerie modes
 Indication for silence / striking / night modes

Others (6 functions)
 Movement power reserve indicator
 Power-reserve indication for the striking train
 Winding crown position indicator
 Dual barrel winding system
 Time setting in two positions and two directions
 Secret mechanism (opening of the button for alarm arbor)

Other complicated pocket watches
Patek Philippe Calibre 89 (1989) — 33 complications
Patek Philippe Henry Graves Supercomplication (1933) — 24 complications

References

External links

Individual watches